Four Questions is a 2020 album by Arturo O'Farrill and the Afro Latin Jazz Orchestra. It won the 2021 Grammy Award for Best Latin Jazz Album.

Track listing

References

Arturo O'Farrill albums
Grammy Award for Best Latin Jazz Album
2020 albums